Kandice Pelletier (born November 21, 1981) is an American beauty queen, swimwear designer, and dancer from Marietta, Georgia. She competed in the Miss America pageant and on two seasons of the reality television show The Amazing Race. As of 2012, she was the president of Kandice Pelletier Swimwear.

Education
Pelletier graduated with honors from North Cobb High School in 2000 and went on to attempt a major in communications at Kennesaw State University.  Though she never graduated KSU she moved to New York City to pursue a dance career and earned a degree in entertainment communications at New York University.

Career

Performing arts
While in New York, Pelletier worked as a Radio City Music Hall Rockette and was immortalized into the Rockette wax figure at Madame Tussauds Time's Square location.  Pelletier later appeared in the movie-musical remake of The Producers as a member of the dancing chorus ("a girl with the pearls") .  Kandice appeared as the 'coach' on MTV's reality television series MADE in the episode entitled "Beauty Queen". It was episode 23 of season nine of the program.

Pageantry
Pelletier competed in her first Miss America state pageant in 2002 when she was a quarter-finalist in the Miss Georgia pageant as Miss Cobb County.  She returned as Miss Coastal Georgia the following year and placed first runner-up.  Representing Georgia, Pelletier went on to win the National Sweetheart pageant for Miss America state runners-up in 2003.

After moving to New York to attend New York University, Pelletier competed as Miss Manhattan in the Miss New York pageant and placed first runner-up to Christina Ellington, who she had competed against at National Sweetheart.  The following year she won the Miss New York 2005 title, after winning the Miss Greater New York City local pageant.  In 2005, Pelletier was also a double state preliminary winner, with awards for swimsuit and talent.

Pelletier's sister Kendra Pelletier is also involved in pageantry.  She placed in the top fifteen at the Miss Georgia USA 2007 pageant won by Brittany Swann and second runnerup in the Miss Capital City 2007 pageant in the Miss Georgia system. She also competed in the 2007 Miss Georgia Pageant as Miss Southern Rivers where she was a top 10 finalist.

The Amazing Race

She appeared on Season 10 with race partner Dustin, who competed at Miss America 2006 as Miss California. After traveling through Asia, Africa and Europe the pair won two legs and ultimately finished in fourth place. They also competed in All-Stars season after traveling through South America, Africa, Poland, Malaysia, Hong Kong, Guam, Hawaii and their final destination in San Francisco, the pair won four legs before finishing in second place, ultimately falling short in the final leg where they lost the one million dollar grand prize and The Amazing Race: All Stars winners' title to Newly Dating couple Eric & Danielle who competed on opposing teams in Season 9.

Vanity Fair
Pelletier appeared alongside James Gandolfini on the April 2007 cover of Vanity Fair shot by Annie Leibovitz.

Swimwear
In 2011, she started a swimwear line, Kandice Pelletier Swimwear, focused on providing swimsuits to pageant contestants. The company sponsors over 50 state pageants each year in the Miss America and Miss USA systems. The company also served as the official swimwear of the Miss USA 2014 competition, the Miss Teen USA 2014 competition, and the Miss Teen USA 2013 competition.

In addition to Miss USA 2014, Miss Teen USA 2014, and Miss Teen USA 2013, Pelletier's clients include the last three winners of the Miss America competition, who each won their state titles wearing Pelletier's swimsuits earning Pelletier the nickname "America’s pageant swimwear expert".

Personal life
She married Jim Halpin, Jr. in 2018 and changed her surname to Halpin. She currently lives in New York City with her husband and two adopted children. She gave birth to a daughter named Collete Elizabeth Halpin on November 5th, 2022.

References

External links
Pageant News Bureau profile
 Kandice Pelletier - Amazing Race Wiki

The Amazing Race (American TV series) contestants
Living people
Miss America 2006 delegates
1981 births
People from Marietta, Georgia
Kennesaw State University alumni
The Rockettes
Miss New York winners
New York University alumni